Jean-Jacques Boissard (1528 – 30 October 1602) was an antiquary and Neo-Latin poet.

Life
He was born at Besançon and educated at Leuven; but he secretly left the seminary there, and travelled through (Germany) to Italy, where he remained several years and was often reduced to poverty. His time in Italy gave him a taste for antiquities, and he formed a collection of artefacts from Rome and its vicinity.  He then visited the islands of Greece, but illness obliged him to return to Rome. Here he completed his collection, and returned to France; but not being permitted to profess publicly the Protestant religion, which he had embraced some time before, he withdrew to Metz, where he remained till his death.

Works
He provided text and drawings for books by Robert Boissard, Theodor de Bry, Jacques Granthomme and Alexandre Vallée. Major works are:
Poemata (1574)
Emblemata (1584)
Icones Virorum Illustrium (1597)
Vitae et Icones Sultanorum Turcicorum, etc. (1597)
Theatrum Vitae Humanae (1596)
Romanae urbis topographia et antiquitates (1597–1602)
De Divinatione et Magicis Praestigiis (1605)
Habitus Variarum Orbis Gentium (1581), ornamented with seventy illuminated figures.

Notes

External links

  His Bibliotheca chalcographica, hoc est Virtute et eruditione clarorum Virorum Imagines
Attribution

Digitized Edition of 'Bibliotheca chalcographica, hoc est Virtute et eruditione clarorum Virorum Imagine, latin, from 1669, at E-rara.ch

1528 births
1602 deaths
Writers from Besançon
16th-century French poets
French Protestants
New Latin-language poets
French antiquarians
French male poets
French male non-fiction writers